The Blacks is a 2009 Croatian drama film directed by Goran Dević and Zvonimir Jurić. The film was selected as the Croatian entry for the Best Foreign Language Film at the 83rd Academy Awards, but it did not make the final shortlist.

Plot
The main title of the film refers to a fictional paramilitary formation, which uses the nickname of a unit of the Croatian paramilitary known as the Croatian defence forces and by the German occupied Independent State of Croatia during World War II.The plot takes place in the post-war Osijek. The soldiers were given the task of retrieving the bodies of fallen comrades from the minefield. The plot includes real events related to the "Garage" case, a war crime in which Serb prisoners of war were tortured.

Cast
 Ivo Gregurević as Ivo
 Krešimir Mikić as Barišić
 Franjo Dijak as Franjo
 Rakan Rushaidat as Darko
 Nikša Butijer as Saran
 Emir Hadžihafizbegović as Lega
 Stjepan Pete as File
 Saša Anočić as Vozač

Awards and nominations

See also
 List of submissions to the 83rd Academy Awards for Best Foreign Language Film
 List of Croatian submissions for the Academy Award for Best Foreign Language Film

References

External links

2009 films
2000s Croatian-language films
2000s war drama films
Works about the Croatian War of Independence
Yugoslav Wars films
Croatian war drama films
2009 drama films
Croatian World War II films